Maio Patti (Mayopatti, Mayo Patti)  is a village in Phagwara Tehsil in Kapurthala district of Punjab State, India. The village is administrated by a Sarpanch, who is an elected representative.

Transport 
Phagwara Junction Railway Station,  Mauli Halt Railway Station are the very nearby railway stations to Maio Patti (Mayopatti, Mayo Patti) however, Jalandhar City Rail Way station is 23 km away from the village.  The village is 118 km away from Sri Guru Ram Dass Jee International Airport in Amritsar and the another nearest airport is Sahnewal Airport  in Ludhiana which is located 40 km away from the village.  Phagwara , Jandiala , Jalandhar, Phillaur are the nearby Cities to Maio Patti (Mayopatti, Mayo Patti) village.

References

External links
  Villages in Kapurthala
 Kapurthala Villages List

Villages in Kapurthala district